"The Screwfly Solution" is the seventh episode in the second season of Masters of Horror. It is based upon the 1977 science fiction short story of the same name by Alice Sheldon (under the alias Raccoona Sheldon), credited in the film as James Tiptree, Jr. Many of the scenes in Sam Hamm's script are expansions of single lines in this epistolary story.  Director Joe Dante read the story in the 1980s and had wanted to make a film version ever since. He presented the story as straight horror, eschewing his usual humor and without using his usual company of stock actors. Jason Priestley and Elliott Gould star.

Plot
When a virus overcomes the male population of the world and turns them into murderous psychopaths, a mother and daughter escape across a country where their safety is in question.

Over the summer, a series of femicides break out all over the world, which comes to the notice of Anne Alstein (Kerry Norton), whose husband Alan (Jason Priestley) is working alongside Barney (Elliott Gould) on the solution to an insect problem in the rain forest. The two have a daughter, Amy (Brenna O'Brien). Their friend in epidemiologist Bella Sartiano (Linda Darlow) leaves for Jacksonville, Florida, where a large group of femicides took place. She interviews an infected U.S. Army soldier, Private William Holicky (Steve Lawlor), who savagely murdered a stripper at a club. The aggression is linked to sexual arousal, and many of the infected men use extremist religious rhetoric to justify the murders. Bella discovers that tens of thousands of similar murders are happening elsewhere in the world, but is attacked and killed by the infected mayor.

Before her death, Bella informed Barney of the epidemic as they were coordinating matching findings. Barney and Alan head to Washington D.C. to brief a panel of high-ranking officials on whether the cause of the condition is natural or bioterrorism. The only way to avoid it is chemical castration, with the alternative being actual castration. The reception is skeptical and indignant; the US Army General on the panel bluntly declares he will oppose this drastic solution, thereby ensuring his troops will turn on female personnel and civilians once they become infected. Barney takes the shot but Alan refuses, stating he'll be fine with pills, until he begins to have dreams of killing Anne. On the plane ride home, Alan witnesses two murders and realizes that every man on the plane is infected, himself included. He calls his wife and daughter to say goodbye, telling them that he won't be himself by the time he gets in their physical proximity.

In September, Anne and Amy have continued on northwards to Canada with other women. The two encounter the infected Alan in their cabin at Ontario rainforest, who begins sexually assaulting his daughter until Anne shoots him in the legs. At Alan's struggling insistence of whatever is left of him in his self-hating state, they escape, but Amy, not understanding the situation, resumes rebelling against her mother and returns to Alan the moment she gets to hijack the car when opportunity comes in the dark of night, and Anne arrives back to the cabin too late in the light of day, in order to save her. It is presumed that she was forced to kill Alan.
Having gone unconscious, Anne wakes up in a hospital to hooded Barney where a rash of murders are being inflicted on the female patients as he informs her that she was comatose for 3 days. They manage to escape, and Anne agrees to wear a "man" disguise to hide herself from the infected males. She overhears a conversation between two men, revealing that the area's female population has been wiped out. It is implied that the adult men turn on the less-masculine boys next, killing them off as well.

Forced to live out in a simple camping tent during a harsh winter, Barney soon falls ill. He encourages her to survive no matter what, as mankind still has a chance with a female survivor. Come November, over the winter, he dies peacefully and she buries him. After a trip back at the nearest convenience store, she tries to escape hunters who discover her and get soon following her car from theirs; as she accelerates her car and diverges into the woods to ultimately hide and wait them out, the source of the epidemic is discovered. Bright aliens formed of light are the culprits, using alien technology to create the femicide epidemic as a form of biological control (the titular "screwfly solution"). They kill the hunters that pursued Anne, apparently to take some of their brain matter, and she watches them from nearby, hiding under the cover of bushes. Sometime afterwards by the month's end, she shivers for survival in a snowstorm, positioned fetal outside a cave. By December, all female life on Earth is presumed to have been exterminated, leaving the infected men to slowly die off.

Production
When interviewed while shooting the film in Vancouver, the director summarized it:
 The film was shot using a digital camera for the first time. The director chose this experimental technique especially to give the film a different look. Jason Priestley explained his interpretation of the motivation of the scientist Alan, stating:

Release
The film was screened at the 24th Turin Film Festival. The DVD was released on June 12, 2007.

Reception
Michael Gingold of Fangoria magazine, awarded the film three skulls for its "stinging mix of sociopolitical commentary and traditional horror mayhem". He saw the political message as a link between religious fervor and misogyny with special reference to Islamic fundamentalism.  The effect of violent horror movies upon men within the story was thought to be witty self-reference though the overall tone was considered "deadly serious".  The lead actor, Jason Priestley, was thought to have been weaker than the role required while the performances of Kerry Norton, as Alan's wife Anne, and Brenna O'Brien, as her daughter Amy, were thought sympathetic and more effective.

Peter Brown of iF magazine felt that the presentation of the main feature was too rushed and would have been better at 1.5 to 2 hours rather than the 58 minutes allowed by the 1 hour format.  Also the denouement was revealed too soon and so suspense was lacking in the second half. He thought that the DVD extras were interesting, providing Joe Dante's account of the conversion from the short story and details of the effects used for the aliens in the story.  Overall, his rating for this DVD was C.

References

External links
 
 Interview with Sam Hamm by Avedon Carol about the Masters of Horror adaptation

2006 American television episodes
Masters of Horror episodes
Television episodes based on short fiction
Films directed by Joe Dante
Films scored by Hummie Mann